Tillicum or Tilikum is a word in Chinook Jargon that means people, family, tribe, and relatives, and may refer to:

Places
 Tilikum Crossing, a bridge in Portland, Oregon
 Tillicum, Lakewood, a neighborhood in Lakewood, Washington
Tillicum station, a planned commuter rail station in Lakewood, Washington
 Tillicum Centre, a shopping centre in Victoria, British Columbia
 Tilikum Place, a plaza in Seattle, Washington
 Tillicum Village, a Seattle-area visitor attraction
 Tillicum Beach, a hamlet in Alberta near Camrose

Boats and ships
 Tilikum (boat), a dug-out canoe used in Jack Voss and Norman Luxton's voyage around the world
 CFAV Tillicum (YTM 555), a harbour tug of the Canadian Armed Forces
 MV Tillikum an Evergreen State-class ferry of the Washington State Ferries system

Other uses
 Tilikum (orca) (1981–2017), a bull orca, owned by SeaWorld Orlando, that had been involved in three human deaths
 Trillium ovatum var. Tillicum, a variant of  T. ovatum, a small flowering plant native to the Pacific Northwest
 "Tillicum" (song), a song by Syrinx
 Tillicum Middle School, a middle school in the Bellevue School District in Bellevue, Washington

See also
Tillicum Elementary School (disambiguation)